Tīpapa marae may refer to:
 Tīpapa marae at Murupara, New Zealand
 Kākānui (Tīpapa) marae at Ruatāhuna, New Zealand